"Luckenbach, Texas (Back to the Basics of Love)" is a song recorded by American country music artist Waylon Jennings. It was released in April 1977 as the first single from the album Ol' Waylon. It was written by Chips Moman and Bobby Emmons.

Content
The song refers to a couple whose position in "high society" has placed strains on their marriage ("this successful life we're livin' got us feudin' like the Hatfields and McCoys") and finances ("four-car garage, and we're still buildin' on"). Jennings suggests that the couple return to "the basics of love" and relocate to the small town of Luckenbach, Texas.

References in the song include the Hatfields and McCoys, Hank Williams, Mickey Newbury, Jerry Jeff Walker, and "Blue Eyes Crying in the Rain."

The final refrain of the song features a guest vocal by Willie Nelson.

History 
The song was co-written by Chips Moman and Bobby Emmons who proposed the song to Jennings because his "name's in it."  At the time of recording the song, neither the writers nor Jennings had ever been to Luckenbach. In his autobiography, Jennings wrote: "I knew it was a hit song, even though I didn't like it, and still don't."

Chart performance 
The song debuted on April 16, 1977, reaching #1 on the country charts on May 21, 1977, and staying there until June 25, 1977.

Weekly charts

Year-end charts

Cover versions
In 1981, Alvin and the Chipmunks covered the song for their country album Urban Chipmunk.

References 

Ultimate Waylon Jennings CD liner notes, Lenny Kaye, c.2004

1977 singles
Billboard Hot Country Songs number-one singles of the year
RPM Country Tracks number-one singles of the year
Male vocal duets
Waylon Jennings songs
Willie Nelson songs
Songs written by Chips Moman
Song recordings produced by Chips Moman
Songs about Texas
RCA Records singles
1977 songs
Songs written by Bobby Emmons